Wesley Strick (born February 11, 1954) is an American screenwriter who has written such films as Arachnophobia, Batman Returns and Martin Scorsese's remake of Cape Fear. Since 2015, Strick has worked as a writer/executive producer on The Man in the High Castle.

Life and career
Strick was born in New York City, New York, the son of Racelle (née Kessler) and Louis Strick. He is a graduate of U.C. Berkeley, where he studied creative writing with the poet Thom Gunn. Prior to his Hollywood career, he worked as a rock journalist in New York City, contributing features and reviews to Circus, Creem and Rolling Stone.

As a "script doctor" he has done production polishes on such films as Batman Returns, Face/Off and Mission: Impossible 2. Strick's screenplay for True Believer was nominated for a 1990 Edgar Award for Best Mystery Motion Picture.  Strick won a 1994 Saturn Award (with co-writer Jim Harrison) for his screenplay for the Mike Nichols film Wolf.

Since 1995, Strick has served as a creative advisor at the Sundance Institute's Screenwriters Lab. Strick wrote the original script for Tim Burton's unproduced Superman Lives, later re-written by Dan Gilroy as a more budget conscious take on Strick's story. His first novel, Out There in the Dark, was published by St. Martin's Press in February 2006. His second novel, Whirlybird, is available as a Kindle book on Amazon.com. In 2008, Strick co-wrote the screenplay for a remake of A Nightmare on Elm Street, starring Jackie Earle Haley and Rooney Mara, directed by Samuel Bayer. The film won the People's Choice Award for Favorite Horror Movie of 2010.

Strick's adaptation of the Belgian thriller Loft, starring James Marsden and Karl Urban, was released by Open Road in January 2015. In summer 2013, Strick wrote and directed a short film, Watching, Waiting, which screened at numerous 2014 film festivals, including Women and Minorities in Media, Black Maria, Sedona and Williamstown. In fall 2015, Strick relocated to London to write on Season 2 of the Amazon drama series (based on the Philip K. Dick novel) The Man in the High Castle. He returned to Los Angeles in 2016 to resume as a writer/co-executive producer on Season 3 (Strick wrote the season opener, mid-season finale and final episode).  In early 2018, Strick began work on Season 4.

Personal life
Strick is Jewish.

Filmography
True Believer (1989)
Arachnophobia (1990)
Cape Fear (1991)
Final Analysis (1992)
Batman Returns (1992) (uncredited)
Wolf (1994)
The Tie That Binds (1995)
The Saint (1997)
Return to Paradise (1998)
Hitched (2001)
The Glass House (2001)
Doom (2005)
Love Is the Drug aka Addicted to Her Love (2006)
A Nightmare on Elm Street (2010)
The Loft (2014)
The Man in the High Castle (2015-)

Further reading
 "Out There in the Dark"; Wesley Strick; Thomas Dunne Books (February 7, 2006);

References

External links

1954 births
American male screenwriters
Jewish American screenwriters
Living people
Writers from New York City
University of California, Berkeley alumni
Vassar College alumni
Screenwriters from New York (state)
21st-century American Jews